Martin Hackett (born 4 January 1891) was an Irish hurler who played for the Dublin senior team.

Hackett made his first appearance for the team during the 1917 championship and was a regular member of the starting fifteen for just one season. It was a successful year as he won one All-Ireland medal and one Leinster medal.

At club level, Hackett was a one-time county club championship medalist with Collegians.

His brother, Stephen Hackett, was an All-Ireland winner with Tipperary.

References

1891 births
Year of death missing
UCD hurlers
Dublin inter-county hurlers
All-Ireland Senior Hurling Championship winners
Tipperary hurlers